Mapule's Choice, is a 2008 Mosotho short film directed by Kaizer Matsumunyane and produced by Tumelo Matobako. The film deals with life of Mapule, a young garment worker from Maseru who must choose between keeping a secret and saving herself.  

The film was screened and officially selected at Zanzibar International Film Festival in 2009.

References

2008 films
Lesotho short films
2008 short films
Lesotho drama films
Drama short films